The 2018–19 season is the 129th season of competitive football in the Netherlands.

Promotion and relegation

Pre-season

League season

Eredivisie

Eerste Divisie

Tweede Divisie

Derde Divisie

Saturday League

Sunday League

Hoofdklasse

Saturday A League

Saturday B League

Sunday A League

Sunday B League

Eerste Klasse

Eredivisie (women)

Managerial changes

KNVB Cup

National teams

Netherlands national football team

2018–19 UEFA Nations League

2019 UEFA Nations League Finals

UEFA Euro 2020 Qualification

The fixtures were released by UEFA the same day as the draw, which was held on 2 December 2018 in Dublin. Times are CET/CEST, as listed by UEFA (local times, if different, are in parentheses).

Netherlands women's national football team

2019 FIFA Women's World Cup

Group E

Knockout stage

Diary of the season
In May 2019, the referee scored a goal for HSV Hoek against Harkemase Boys in the fourth tier. The goal was all the more noteworthy because it occurred on the last weekend possible before rules changes came into effect from 1 June to stop this kind of activity on the part of the referee.

Deaths

Retirements

 Robin van Persie

Notes

References

 
Seasons in Dutch football
N
N